Saartje Specx (1617–1636) was the daughter of Jacques Specx, governor of the North Quarter of the Dutch East India Company's (VOC's) Asian trading empire, and a Japanese concubine. 

Saartje (Sara in English) was born at the Dutch trading base on the island of Hirado.  In 1629, aged 12, she was living at Batavia in Java under the protection of Jan Coen, governor of the Dutch East Indies, and Eva Ment. There she fell in love with 15-year-old Pieter Cortenhoeff, a Eurasian standard-bearer in the VOC army, and was found making love to him in Coen's private apartment. When the Governor heard of this, a contemporary writer attested, "his face turned white and his chair and the table trembled." Coen had Cortenhoeff beheaded and had to be dissuaded from having Saartje drowned. Instead she was severely beaten in front of the Town Hall of Batavia.

Under the rules governing the VOC's Asian possessions, Saartje Specx, as a part-Asian, had no right to live in the Netherlands. On her father's return to Java she made a good marriage to Georgius Candidius, a Calvinist minister, and accompanied him to the Dutch trading base in Formosa (Taiwan), where she died, aged 19, in 1636.

Jacob Cats wrote a pamphlet about the couple, which was sold 50,000 copies. In 1931, J. Slauerhoff wrote a play on Jan Pieterszoon Coen where the story was told again.

References
 C. Gerretson. Coen's Eerherstel. Amsterdam: Van Kampen. 1944.

1617 births
1636 deaths
Dutch people of Japanese descent
Indonesian people of Japanese descent
17th-century Dutch East Indies people
17th-century Indonesian people